The 2017 AFC Cup knockout stage was played from 16 May to 4 November 2017. A total of 11 teams competed in the knockout stage to decide the champions of the 2017 AFC Cup.

Qualified teams
The following teams advanced from the group stage:
The winners of each of the three groups and the best runners-up in the West Asia Zone (Groups A–C) and the ASEAN Zone (Groups F–H) advanced to the Zonal semi-finals.
The winners of each group in the Central Asia Zone (Group D), the South Asia Zone (Group E), and the East Asia Zone (Group I) advanced to the Inter-zone play-off semi-finals.

Format

In the knockout stage, the 11 teams played a single-elimination tournament, with the teams split into the five zones until the Inter-zone play-off semi-finals. Each tie was played on a home-and-away two-legged basis, except the final which was played as a single match. The away goals rule (for two-legged ties), extra time (away goals would not apply in extra time) and penalty shoot-out were used to decide the winner if necessary (Regulations Article 11.3).

Schedule
The schedule of each round was as follows (W: West Asia Zone; A: ASEAN Zone). Matches in the West Asia Zone were played on Mondays and Tuesdays, while matches in the ASEAN Zone and the Inter-zone play-offs were played on Tuesdays and Wednesdays.

Bracket
The bracket of the knockout stage was determined as follows:

The bracket was decided after the draw for the knockout stage, which was held on 6 June 2017, 15:00 MYT (UTC+8), at the JW Marriott Hotel Kuala Lumpur in Kuala Lumpur, Malaysia.

Zonal semi-finals

In the Zonal semi-finals, the four qualified teams from the West Asia Zone (Groups A–C) played in two ties, and the four qualified teams from the ASEAN Zone (Groups F–H) played in two ties, with the matchups and order of legs determined by the group stage draw and identity of the best runner-up.

|+West Asia Zone

|+ASEAN Zone

West Asia Zone

Al-Quwa Al-Jawiya won 2–1 on aggregate.

Al-Wahda won 4–2 on aggregate.

ASEAN Zone

Home United won 5–4 on aggregate.

4–4 on aggregate. Ceres–Negros won on away goals.

Zonal finals

The draw for the Zonal finals was held on 6 June 2017. In the Zonal finals, the two winners of West Asia Zonal semi-finals played each other, and the two winners of ASEAN Zonal semi-finals played each other, with the order of legs decided by draw. The winner of the West Asia Zonal final advanced to the final, while the winner of the ASEAN Zonal final advanced to the Inter-zone play-off semi-finals.

|+West Asia Zone

|+ASEAN Zone

West Asia Zone

2–2 on aggregate. Al-Quwa Al-Jawiya won on away goals.

ASEAN Zone

Ceres–Negros won 3–2 on aggregate.

Inter-zone play-off semi-finals

The draw for the Inter-zone play-off semi-finals was held on 6 June 2017. In the Inter-zone play-off semi-finals, the four zonal winners other than the West Asia Zone played in two ties, i.e., the winner of the Central Asia Zone (Group D), the winner of the South Asia Zone (Group E), the winner of the East Asia Zone (Group I), and the winner of the ASEAN Zonal final (whose identity was not known at the time of the draw), with the matchups and order of legs decided by draw, without any seeding.

|}

Istiklol won 5–1 on aggregate.

Bengaluru FC won 3–0 on aggregate.

Inter-zone play-off final

In the Inter-zone play-off final, the two winners of the Inter-zone play-off semi-finals played each other, with the order of legs determined by the Inter-zone play-off semi-final draw. The winner of the Inter-zone play-off final advanced to the final.

|}

Istiklol won 3–2 on aggregate.

Final

The draw for the final was held on 6 June 2017. In the final, the winner of the West Asia Zonal final and the winner of the Inter-zone play-off final played each other, with the host team decided by draw.

Notes

References

External links
, the-AFC.com
AFC Cup 2017, stats.the-AFC.com

3
May 2017 sports events in Asia
August 2017 sports events in Asia
September 2017 sports events in Asia
October 2017 sports events in Asia
November 2017 sports events in Asia